Baz (Syriac: ܒܙ) was one of the five independent Assyrian tribes of the Hakkari region.

History
Maha Khtayya was the chief village of the region, followed by Shwawwa. All the Maliks descended from the hereditary Malik-Younan family. The last malik, Malik Khamo Younan of Maha Khtayya died in 1937 at Baghdad, Iraq. The Baz region was also the birthplace and ancestral home of the Assyrian World War I commander General Agha Petros.

The Assyrians of the Baz tribe were renowned carpenters and iron-workers who worked not only in their villages, but throughout Mosul and other large towns of Upper Mesopotamia.

Baznaye are traditionally adherents of the Assyrian Church of the East, and the majority remain adherents. Baznaye can also be found in the Chaldean Catholic Church due to the conversions made in the early 20th century and resettlement near traditional Chaldean villages. Some Baznaye also joined the Ancient Church of the East after the 1968 schism. A very small minority also adhere to Presbyterianism, Anglicanism and Evangelicalism. The patron saint of the region is Mar Qayyoma. Mar Zaia is also highly revered as it was the cathedral church of Diocese of Jilu and Baz.

Assyrian Villages in Baz, Turkey
The Assyrian settlements that traditionally comprised the Baz region in Hakkari consist of the following villages. The region has been empty since they were abandoned in 1915 due to the Assyrian genocide.

Arwantus (Artusnaye)
Shwawwa (Shawutnaye)
Maha Khtayya (Mahaye) (37°27 N, 43°53 E)
Be-Selim (Selimnaye)
Argab (Argabaye)
Kojij (Kojijnaye)

Current Baznaye settlements
These are the villages occupied after the Baznaye were resettled by the British in 1920s and the French in the 1930s.
 
Iraq
Babilo (Shawutnaye)
Bagereh (Selimnaye)
Chaqala (Kojijnaye)
Sardarawa (Artusnaye)
Sorka (Mahaye)
Simele (Mahaye)
Badarrash (Artusnaye)
Sarsing (Artusnaye)
Sikren (Selimnaye)
Sedar (Shawutnaye)
Pirozawa (Argabaye)
Ain Sifni (Mixed Baznaye)
Mawana (Mixed Baznaye)

Syria
Tell Baz (Shawutnaye, Mahaye and some Argabaye)
Tell Ruman Foqani (Selimnaye and Mahaye)

Famous people
General Agha Petros Elia - Assyrian military leader during World War I and Chief Negotiator for the *Assyrian/Chaldean/Syriac people during the 1920s.
 Khairy Boudagh - Assyrian/Chaldean Singer

References

Hakkari
Assyrian tribes